Bronisław Krzywobłocki (19 June 1857 – 25 October 1943) was a Polish military officer and a Colonel of the Polish Army. He served during the Polish-Bolshevik War of 1920 in a variety of posts, including as the commanding officer of the 46th Kresy Rifles Infantry Regiment.

Polish Army officers
1857 births
1943 deaths
Place of birth missing
Place of death missing